Eugene Boris Mirman (born July 24, 1974) is a Russian-American actor, comedian, and writer, known for playing Yvgeny Mirminsky on Delocated and Gene Belcher on the animated comedy Bob's Burgers.

Early life
Mirman was born Evgeniy Borisovich Mirman on July 24, 1974, in Moscow, Russia, when the country was part of the Soviet Union, to Boris Mirman, Jewish Latvian, and Marina, Jewish Russian. His father was a civil engineer. His family immigrated to the United States when he was four years old, and settled in Lexington, Massachusetts, where Mirman attended William Diamond Middle School and Lexington High School. After arriving in the United States, his name was anglicized, his first name being changed to its English form, Eugene, and his patronymic Borisovich being shortened to simply Boris.

Mirman is a graduate of Hampshire College in Western Massachusetts. As part of the college's "design your own major" program, Mirman graduated with a Bachelor of Arts in comedy, with a one-hour routine as his thesis.  He returned to his high school to deliver its 2009 commencement address. He returned to Hampshire to deliver the 2012 commencement speech as well.

Career

Stand-up career
In 2004, Mirman released The Absurd Nightclub Comedy of Eugene Mirman, a CD/DVD on Suicide Squeeze Records. The album was voted one of the Best Albums of 2004 by both The A.V. Club and Time Out New York. His second album, En Garde, Society was released by Sub Pop in 2006. Three years later, Mirman released another comedy album, God Is a Twelve-Year-Old Boy with Aspergers which was recorded in Chicago at the Lakeshore Theatre. In 2012, Mirman released An Evening Of Comedy In A Fake, Underground Laboratory.

Mirman has appeared at the U.S. Comedy Arts Festival in Aspen, Colorado, the Just for Laughs Festival in Montreal, Bumbershoot and South by Southwest. He co-produced the weekly standup-variety show Invite Them Up with Bobby Tisdale and Holly Schlesinger, which won a Nightlife Award. Guests included the comedians Mike Birbiglia, Aziz Ansari, David Cross, and Chelsea Peretti. He currently produces Pretty Good Friends (formerly Tearing the Veil of Maya) at Union Hall in Park Slope, Brooklyn with Julie Smith, which has been voted the best comedy night in New York City by New York Magazine. Similar to comedians David Cross and Patton Oswalt, Mirman often performs in rock clubs and theaters as opposed to traditional comedy clubs. Often touring the US, Mirman occasionally opens for the comedy troupe Stella (former members of The State). He has opened for various bands such as The Shins and toured with Modest Mouse, Yo La Tengo, Gogol Bordello, Andrew Bird, and Cake. In 2012, Mirman stated that opening for musicians is uncommon and that music concerts pay three times that of a comedy gig. Mirman also toured with Patton Oswalt, Brian Posehn and Maria Bamford on the Comedians of Comedy tour. He has toured as an opener for the comedy duo Flight of the Conchords (and was a regular actor on their HBO series) and with Andy Kindler and Marc Maron in Stand Uppity.

In January 2010, Mirman performed standup comedy on the John Oliver's New York Stand Up Show on Comedy Central.

Mirman's Eugene Mirman Comedy Festival ran for 10 years from 2008 to 2017.

On April 10, 2015, Mirman filmed a live stand-up special in Tucson, Arizona, directed by Bobcat Goldthwait. The special was released on Netflix in 2015 as Eugene Mirman: Vegan on His Way to the Complain Store.

Television career
Mirman has appeared on several TV shows, including Late Night with Conan O'Brien, HBO's Flight of the Conchords as the character Eugene, the BBC's Russell Howard's Good News, Comedy Central Presents, Delocated, Aqua Teen Hunger Force, Comedy Central's Premium Blend, VH1, Third Watch, Cartoon Network's Home Movies, Cheap Seats, Lucy, the Daughter of the Devil and more. He also played a spokes-potato on Food Network.

In 2010, Mirman co-starred with Phill Jupitus in the Dave TV movie Comedy Exchange. In late 2010, Mirman performed on the Comedy Central show The Benson Interruption.

On February 21, 2011, Mirman appeared on The Colbert Report as a fertility clown. On April 4, 2013, Mirman provided the voice for Cecil Tunt, multi-millionaire brother of Cheryl/Carol Tunt on FX's Archer. On March 13, 2016, Mirman appeared on Last Week Tonight as a hacker.

Mirman voices the character Gene Belcher on the Fox animated series Bob's Burgers.

Mirman was a guest voice as Emperor Keith Merman in the Netflix original The Adventures of Puss in Boots. Mirman voices the character Burger on the animated show Apple & Onion.

Radio and podcasts
In January 2009, Mirman released a satirical self-help book entitled The Will to Whatevs.

He often appears on StarTalk Radio, hosted by Neil deGrasse Tyson. He has also appeared several times on the TV adaptation.

Mirman guest starred as an "Expert witness" on humorist John Hodgman's podcast Judge John Hodgman.

Mirman appeared on Ken Reid's TV Guidance Counselor Podcast on April 24, 2015. The episode was recorded live as part of the 2015 Eugene Mirman Comedy Festival in Boston.

Mirman plays a supporting role of Benny the gerbil on the children's podcast This Podcast Has Fleas in 2017.

Mirman hosted his own podcast, Hold On with Eugene Mirman, in 2017–18.

Personal life
On September 7, 2015, Mirman wed his longtime partner Katie Westfall-Tharp (1980 –  2020). She was a set decorator who worked on such productions as Inside Amy Schumer and Human Giant. The two remained married until Westfall-Tharp's death from cancer on January 29, 2020. They had one child together, son Oliver, who was born in 2016.

Discography
 The Absurd Nightclub Comedy of Eugene Mirman (2004)
 Invite Them Up (2005)
 En Garde, Society! (2006)
 Comedians of Comedy 3" Tour CD (2006)
 God Is a Twelve-Year-Old Boy with Asperger's (2009)
 An Evening of Comedy In a Fake Underground Laboratory  (2012)
 I'm Sorry (You're Welcome) (2015)

Filmography

Film

Television

Bibliography
 The Will to Whatevs (2009)

References

Further reading

External links

 Eugene Mirman official website
 Eugene Mirman on MySpace
 
 Pretty Good Friends: Comedic Programming

Suicide Squeeze Records artists
1974 births
Living people
American male comedians
Jewish American male comedians
American male television actors
American television writers
American male television writers
American male voice actors
American podcasters
Hampshire College alumni
Sub Pop artists
American people of Russian-Jewish descent
American people of Latvian-Jewish descent
Soviet emigrants to the United States
Soviet Jews
Russian stand-up comedians
Russian humorists
Jewish humorists
20th-century American comedians
21st-century American comedians
Lexington High School alumni
Russian male voice actors
Male actors from Moscow
Jewish Russian actors
21st-century American Jews